The 2020 Ghazi Amanullah Khan Regional One Day Tournament was a List A cricket competition that took place in Kandahar, Afghanistan between 10 and 22 October 2020. It was the fourth edition of the competition to be played with List A status, following the announcements by the International Cricket Council (ICC) in February and May 2017. Mis Ainak Region were the defending champions.

Following the conclusion of the group stage, Amo Region had progressed directly to the final, with Mis Ainak Region and Band-e-Amir Region moving to the Eliminator knock-out match. In the Eliminator match, Mis Ainak Region beat Band-e-Amir Region by seven wickets to join Amo Region in the final. In the final, Mis Ainak Region beat Amo Region by seven wickets to win their second title.

Fixtures

Points table

 Advanced to the Final
 Advanced to the Eliminator

Group stage

Finals

References

External links
 Series home at ESPN Cricinfo

Ghazi
Domestic cricket competitions in 2020–21
Ghazi Amanullah Khan Regional One Day Tournament